French Dahomey was a French colony and part of French West Africa from 1894 to 1958. After World War II, by the establishment of the French Fourth Republic in 1947, Dahomey became part of the French Union with an increased autonomy. On 4 October 1958 the French Fifth Republic was established and the French Union became the French Community. The colony became the self-governing Republic of Dahomey within the Community, and two years later on 1 August 1960, it gained full independence and became Benin in 1975.

History

Kingdom of Dahomey

The Kingdom of Dahomey existed in the region from the 17th to 19th centuries.

Colony
The French takeover and colonization of the Kingdom of Dahomey began in 1872. The First Franco-Dahomean War in 1890 further weakened it. The Second Franco-Dahomean War resulted in it becoming a French protectorate in 1894.

Under the French, a port was constructed at Cotonou, and railroads were built. School facilities were expanded by Roman Catholic missions. In 1946, Dahomey became an overseas territory, part of the French Union, with its own parliament and representation in the French national assembly.

On 4 December 1958, it became the Republic of Dahomey, self-governing within the French Community.

Independence
On 1 August 1960, the Republic of Dahomey gained full independence from France.

The republic's first president was Hubert Maga, who had been the Prime Minister during the overseas territory's last year under French rule.

See also
List of the colonial governors of French Dahomey
 (c. 1600−1904)

References

Further reading 
 

 
History of Benin by period
French West Africa
Former colonies in Africa
Dahomey
Dahomey
States and territories established in 1904
States and territories disestablished in 1958
1904 establishments in French West Africa
1958 disestablishments in French West Africa
1904 establishments in Africa
1958 disestablishments in Africa
1904 establishments in the French colonial empire
1958 disestablishments in the French colonial empire
1950s in the Republic of Dahomey